Marianne Jensen  (born 14 January 1970) is a Danish footballer who played as a midfielder for the Denmark women's national football team. She was part of the team at the 1991 FIFA Women's World Cup, UEFA Women's Euro 1991 and UEFA Women's Euro 1993. At the club level, she played for HEI Aarhus in Denmark.

References

External links
 

1970 births
Living people
VSK Aarhus (women) players
Danish women's footballers
Denmark women's international footballers
Place of birth missing (living people)
1991 FIFA Women's World Cup players
Women's association football midfielders